The Spanish Gypsy is a 1911 American short silent drama film directed by D. W. Griffith, starring Wilfred Lucas and featuring Blanche Sweet. It was a Biograph production.

Cast
 Wilfred Lucas as Jose
 Vivian Prescott as Pepita
 Kate Bruce as Pepita's Mother
 William J. Butler as The Doctor
 Jeanie MacPherson as Mariana (as Jeannie MacPherson)
 Claire McDowell as Paula
 Mack Sennett as Gypsy
 Blanche Sweet
 Kate Toncray as Gypsy

Critical reception
A review in Motography described the performance of the gypsy girl as "brilliant throughout". It also praised the "high artistic ability on the part of the producer" in converting a location in California into a convincing representation of Andalusia.

See also
 D. W. Griffith filmography
 Blanche Sweet filmography

References

External links

1911 films
American silent short films
Biograph Company films
American black-and-white films
Films about Romani people
1911 drama films
1911 short films
Films directed by D. W. Griffith
Silent American drama films
1910s American films
1910s English-language films